Dan Hindmarsh (born 8 October 1998) is a professional rugby league footballer who plays as a  or  for the London Broncos in the Betfred Championship. 

He has spent time on loan from the Broncos at Oxford, London Skolars and the Coventry Bears in League 1, and the Sheffield Eagles in the Betfred Championship.

Career
In 2018 Hindmarsh made his professional debut for the London Broncos against Workington Town in Round 4 of the Challenge Cup.

References

External links

London Broncos profile
SL profile

Living people
1998 births
English rugby league players
Rugby league second-rows
London Broncos players
London Skolars players